Basil Fadhel (born 10 May 1963) is an Iraqi former football midfielder who played for Iraq.He played for the national team in the 1989 Peace and Friendship Cup.

Statistics

International goals
Scores and results list Iraq's goal tally first.

References

Iraqi footballers
Iraq international footballers
Association football midfielders
1963 births
Living people